In the mathematical field of knot theory, the Jones polynomial is a knot polynomial discovered by Vaughan Jones in 1984.  Specifically, it is an invariant of an oriented knot or link which assigns to each oriented knot or link a Laurent polynomial in the variable  with integer coefficients.

Definition by the bracket

Suppose we have an oriented link , given as a knot diagram. Here the bracket polynomial is a Laurent polynomial in the variable  with integer coefficients.

First, we define the auxiliary polynomial (also known as the normalized bracket polynomial) 

The writhe of a diagram is the number of positive crossings ( in the figure below) minus the number of negative crossings. The writhe is not a knot invariant.

Invariance under type II and III Reidemeister moves follows from invariance of the bracket under those moves. The bracket polynomial is known to change by a factor of  under a type I Reidemeister move.

This results in a Laurent polynomial with integer coefficients in the variable .

Jones polynomial for tangles

This construction of the Jones polynomial for tangles is a simple generalization of the Kauffman bracket of a link. The construction was developed by Vladimir Turaev and published in 1990.

Let  be a non-negative integer and  denote the set of all isotopic types of tangle diagrams, with  ends, having no crossing points and no closed components (smoothings). Turaev's construction makes use of the previous construction for the Kauffman bracket and associates to each -end oriented tangle an element of the free -module , where   is the ring of Laurent polynomials with integer coefficients in the variable .

Definition by braid representation

Jones' original formulation of his polynomial came from his study of operator algebras.  In Jones' approach, it resulted from a kind of "trace" of a particular braid representation into an algebra which originally arose while studying certain models, e.g. the Potts model, in statistical mechanics.

Let a link L be given. A theorem of Alexander states that it is the trace closure of a braid, say with n strands. It can be checked easily that this defines a representation.

This gives , where   is the bracket polynomial. This can be seen by considering, as Louis Kauffman did, the Temperley–Lieb algebra as a particular diagram algebra.

An advantage of this approach is that one can pick similar representations into other algebras, such as the R-matrix representations, leading to "generalized Jones invariants".

Properties
The Jones polynomial is characterized by taking the value 1 on any diagram of the unknot and satisfies the following skein relation:

Thus, an amphicheiral knot, a knot equivalent to its mirror image, has palindromic entries in its Jones polynomial. See the article on skein relation for an example of a computation using these relations.

Another remarkable property of this invariant states that the Jones polynomial of an alternating link is an alternating polynomial. This property was proved by Morwen Thistlethwaite in 1987. Another proof of this last property is due to Hernando Burgos-Soto, who also gave an extension to tangles of the property.

The Jones polynomial is not a complete invariant. There exist an infinite number of non-equivalent knots that have the same Jones polynomial. An example of two distinct knots having the same Jones polynomial can be found in the book by Murasugi.

Colored Jones polynomial 

For a positive integer , the -colored Jones polynomial  is a generalisation of the Jones polynomial. It is the Reshetikhin–Turaev invariant associated with the -irreducible representation of the quantum group . One thinks of the strands of a link as being "colored" by a representation, hence the name.

,
These properties are deduced from the fact that colored Jones polynomials are Reshetikhin-Turaev invariants.

Let  be a knot. Similarly, the -colored Jones polynomial of  can be given a combinatorial description using the Jones-Wenzl idempotents, as follows:
view it as an element of the Temperley-Lieb algebra;
insert the Jones-Wenzl idempotents on some  parallel strands.

Relationship to other theories

Link with Chern–Simons theory

Link with quantum knot invariants

By substituting  for the variable  of the Jones polynomial and expanding it as the series of h each of the coefficients turn to be the Vassiliev invariant of the knot . In order to unify the Vassiliev invariants (or, finite type invariants), Maxim Kontsevich constructed the Kontsevich integral. The value of the Kontsevich integral, which is the infinite sum of 1, 3-valued chord diagrams, named the Jacobi chord diagrams, reproduces the Jones polynomial along with the  weight system studied by Dror Bar-Natan.

Link with the volume conjecture

By numerical examinations on some hyperbolic knots, Rinat Kashaev discovered that substituting the n-th root of unity into the parameter of the colored Jones polynomial corresponding to the n-dimensional representation, and limiting it as n grows to infinity, the limit value would give the hyperbolic volume of the knot complement. (See Volume conjecture.)

Link with Khovanov homology

In 2000 Mikhail Khovanov constructed a certain chain complex for knots and links and showed that the homology induced from it is a knot invariant (see Khovanov homology). The Jones polynomial is described as the Euler characteristic for this homology.

Detection of the unknot
It is an open question whether there is a nontrivial knot with Jones polynomial equal to that of the unknot.  It is known that there are nontrivial links with Jones polynomial equal to that of the corresponding unlinks by the work of Morwen Thistlethwaite. It was shown by Kronheimer and Mrowka that there is no nontrivial knot with Khovanov homology equal to that of the unknot.

See also

HOMFLY polynomial
Alexander polynomial
Volume conjecture
Chern–Simons theory
Quantum group

Notes

References

 (explains the definition by bracket polynomial and its relation to Jones' formulation by braid representation)

External links
 
 Links with trivial Jones polynomial by Morwen Thistlethwaite
 

Knot theory
Polynomials
Knot invariants